Sieraków is a town in western Poland with 8,768 inhabitants (2012). Located by the Warta River, it is situated in the Międzychód County in the Greater Poland Voivodeship. Sieraków is known as a holiday destination with well-developed tourism and sport infrastructure. It is surrounded by extensive areas of forest and lakes, including the protected area called Sieraków Landscape Park.

History 

As part of the region of Greater Poland, i.e. the cradle of the Polish state, the area formed part of Poland since its establishment in the 10th century. It was a private town, administratively located in the Poznań County in the Poznań Voivodeship in the Greater Poland Province of the Kingdom of Poland.

During the Second Partition of Poland in 1793, Sieraków, under its Germanized name Zirke was annexed by the Kingdom of Prussia. Following the successful Greater Poland uprising of 1806, it was regained by Poles and included within the short-lived Duchy of Warsaw. After the duchy's dissolution in 1815, it was re-annexed by Prussia. The local population was subjected to Germanisation policies. In 1871, it also became part of Germany and was located in the Birnbaum district in the Prussian Province of Posen. According to the census of 1871, the town had a population of 2,527, of which 1,130 (44.7%) were Poles.

The town was captured by Polish insurgents in the Greater Poland uprising in 1919 and was subsequently assigned to the Second Polish Republic through the Treaty of Versailles. During World War II in 1939, the town was occupied by Nazi Germany and was annexed as part of the Birnbaum district in Reichsgau Wartheland. In 1939–1940, the occupiers carried out expulsions of Poles, whose houses were then handed over to German colonists as part of the Lebensraum policy. Towards the end of the war in 1945, it was captured by the Red Army and was restored to Poland.

In 1975–1998, it was administratively located in the Poznań Voivodeship.

Notable residents
 Lewis Naphtali Dembitz (1833–1907), German American legal scholar
 Hartmut Neugebauer (1942-2017) German actor and voice actor
 Krzysztof Opaliński (1611-1655), Polish nobleman and political satirist

Gallery

See also
 Piotr Opaliński, Krzysztof Opaliński, Łukasz Opaliński

External links

 Sierakow official web page (in Polish)
 Parish of Sierakow official web page (in Polish)
 TKKF
 Discussion forum

Major corporations 
 WartaGlass
 Glass Work Majchrzak

References 

Cities and towns in Greater Poland Voivodeship
Międzychód County
Poznań Voivodeship (1921–1939)